David Hudnut is an artist whose work has appeared in role-playing games.

Career
His Dungeons & Dragons work includes the cover art for Heroes of Battle (2005), Heroes of Horror (2005), and the adventures Red Hand of Doom (2006), and Expedition to the Demonweb Pits (2007), and interior art for Draconomicon (2003), Unearthed Arcana (2004), Planar Handbook (2004), Frostburn (2004), Races of Destiny (2004), Complete Adventurer (2005), Sandstorm (2005), Player's Handbook II  (2006), Monster Manual IV (2006), and Rules Compendium (2007). He also did the cover art for the Dragonlance novel The Alien Sea (2006).

He is known for his work on the Magic: The Gathering collectible card game.

References

External links
 Official website
 

Living people
Role-playing game artists
Year of birth missing (living people)